German submarine U-631 was a Type VIIC U-boat built for Nazi Germany's Kriegsmarine for service during World War II.
She was laid down on 5 September 1941 by Blohm & Voss, Hamburg as yard number 607, launched on 27 May 1942 and commissioned on 16 July 1942 under Oberleutnant zur See Jürgen Krüger.

Design
German Type VIIC submarines were preceded by the shorter Type VIIB submarines. U-631 had a displacement of  when at the surface and  while submerged. She had two shafts and two  propellers.

U-631 was fitted with five  torpedo tubes (four fitted at the bow and one at the stern), fourteen torpedoes, one  SK C/35 naval gun, 220 rounds, and one twin  C/30 anti-aircraft gun. The boat had a complement of between forty-four and sixty.

Service history
The boat's career began with training at 5th U-boat Flotilla on 16 July 1942, followed by active service on 1 January 1943 as part of the 9th Flotilla for the remainder of her service.

Fate
U-631 was sunk on 17 October 1943 in the North Atlantic SE of Cape Farewell, Greenland, in position , by depth charges from British corvette . All crew members died.

Wolfpacks
U-631 took part in seven wolfpacks, namely:
 Falke (28 December 1942 – 19 January 1943)
 Landsknecht (19 – 28 January 1943)
 Stürmer (11 – 20 March 1943)
 Seewolf 2 (21 – 30 March 1943)
 Meise (11 – 27 April 1943)
 Rossbach (27 September – 9 October 1943)
 Schlieffen (14 – 17 October 1943)

Summary of raiding history

References

Bibliography

External links

German Type VIIC submarines
1942 ships
U-boats commissioned in 1942
Ships lost with all hands
U-boats sunk in 1943
U-boats sunk by depth charges
U-boats sunk by British warships
World War II shipwrecks in the Atlantic Ocean
World War II submarines of Germany
Ships built in Hamburg
Maritime incidents in October 1943